Rocio “Ro” “Rorro” Hernandez (born April 14, 1985) is a Spanish-born Puerto Rican retired professional footballer and National Team Captain. She has been a member, as well as the Olympic team captain of the Puerto Rico women's national team.

Early and personal life
Hernández was raised in Madrid. She was born to a Spanish father and a Puerto Rican mother.

International goals
Scores and results list Puerto Rico's goal tally first.

References

1985 births
Living people
Women's association football defenders
Puerto Rican women's footballers
Puerto Rico women's international footballers
Competitors at the 2010 Central American and Caribbean Games
Puerto Rican people of Spanish descent
Florida Institute of Technology alumni
UTEP Miners women's soccer players
Pearland High School alumni
Puerto Rican expatriate women's footballers
Puerto Rican expatriate sportspeople in Sweden
Expatriate women's footballers in Sweden
LGBT association football players
Puerto Rican LGBT sportspeople
Spanish women's footballers
Footballers from Madrid
Spanish people of Puerto Rican descent
Sportspeople of Puerto Rican descent
Spanish expatriate footballers
Spanish expatriate sportspeople in the United States
Expatriate women's soccer players in the United States
Spanish expatriate sportspeople in Sweden
Spanish LGBT sportspeople